Henry Parry Liddon (1829–1890), also known as H. P. Liddon, was an English theologian. From 1870 to 1882, he was Dean Ireland's Professor of the Exegesis of Holy Scripture at the University of Oxford.

Biography 

The son of a naval captain, Liddon was born on 20 August 1829 at North Stoneham, near Eastleigh, Hampshire. He was educated at King's College School, and at Christ Church, Oxford, where he graduated, taking a second class, in 1850. As vice principal of the theological college at Cuddesdon (1854–1859) he wielded considerable influence, and, on returning to Oxford as vice-principal of St Edmund Hall, became a force among the undergraduates, exercising his influence in opposition to the liberal reaction against Tractarianism, which had set in after John Henry Newman's conversion to Catholicism in 1845.

In 1864 Walter Kerr Hamilton, the Bishop of Salisbury, whose examining chaplain Liddon had been, appointed him prebendary of Salisbury Cathedral. In 1866 he delivered his Bampton Lectures on the doctrine of the divinity of Christ, published as The Divinity of Our Lord and Saviour Jesus Christ (1867). From that time his fame as a preacher was established. In 1870 he was made canon of St Paul's Cathedral, London. He had before this published Some Words for God against the scepticism of the day. His preaching at St Paul's soon attracted vast crowds. The afternoon sermon, which fell to the canon in residence, had usually been delivered in the choir, but soon after Liddon's appointment it became necessary to preach the sermon under the dome, where from 3000 to 4000 persons used to gather to hear him.

Liddon was praised for grasp of his subject, clarity and lucidity, use of illustration, vividness of imagination, elegance of diction, and sympathy with the intellectual position of those whom he addressed. In the arrangement of his material, he is thought to have imitated the French preachers of the age of Louis XIV.

In 1870 Liddon had also been made Dean Ireland's Professor of the Exegesis of Holy Scripture at Oxford. The combination of the two appointments gave him extensive influence over the Church of England. With Dean Church he restored the influence of the Tractarian school, and he succeeded in popularising the opinions which, in the hands of Edward Bouverie Pusey and John Keble, had appealed to thinkers and scholars. His opposed the Church Discipline Act of 1874, and denounced the Bulgarian atrocities of 1876.

In 1882 he resigned his professorship and travelled in Palestine and Egypt; and showed his interest in the Old Catholic movement by visiting Döllinger at Munich. In 1886, he became chancellor of St Paul's, and declined more than one offer of a bishopric. Liddon was a friend of Lewis Carroll, who accompanied him on a trip to Moscow where Liddon made approaches to leading Russian Orthodox clergy, seeking closer links between them and the Church of England.

He died on 9 September 1890 at the height of his reputation, having nearly completed a biography of Pusey, whom he admired; this work was completed after his death by John Octavius Johnston and Robert Wilson. His entry in the 1911 Encyclopedia Britannica asserts that Liddon's influence during his life was due to his personal fascination and his pulpit oratory rather than to his intellect. As a theologian his outlook was old-fashioned; to the last he maintained the narrow standpoint of Pusey and Keble, in defiance of modern thought and modern scholarship. The publication in 1889 of Lux Mundi edited by Charles Gore, a series of essays attempting to harmonise Anglican Catholic doctrine with modern thought, showed that even at Pusey House, established as the citadel of Puseyism at Oxford, the principles of Pusey were being departed from. He was the last of the classical pulpit orators of the English Church, the last great popular exponent of the traditional Anglican orthodoxy, with the exception of John Charles Ryle (1816-1900), the first Anglican bishop of Liverpool (1880-1900).

 
Liddon is buried in the Chapel of the Order of the British Empire in the crypt of St Paul's Cathedral, close to the grave of Henry Hart Milman.

Works

Besides the works mentioned, Liddon published several volumes of sermons, including a book on sermons on the Magnificat, a volume of Lent lectures entitled Some Elements of Religion (1870), and a collection of Essays and Addresses on such themes as Buddhism, Dante, etc.

Liddon wrote Explanatory Analysis of Paul's Epistle to the Romans published in 1899 and  Explanatory Analysis of Paul's First Epistle to Timothy published in 1897. Both were published posthumously.

Liddon was chosen to preach to the International Medical Congress at St Paul's Cathedral in London in 1881.  During the sermon, he addressed the subject of Darwinian evolution, which was a point of great debate among leading scientists and physicians of the day:

He is also noted for his translation and abridgement of Rosmini's Of the Five Wounds of the Holy Church.

References
John Octavius Johnston (1904), Life and Letters
W. E. Kusselt (1903), H. P. Liddon 
A. B. Donaldson (1900), Five Great Oxford Leaders, from which the life of Liddon was reprinted separately in 1905.
Canon Liddon: A Memoir, at Project Canterbury

Notes

External links

Liddon's works online
"The Divinity of our Lord and Saviour Jesus Christ: 8 lectures preached before the University of Oxford 1866" (published 1867) 
Canon Liddon: A Memoir with his five last sermons (1890)
Henry Parry Liddon papers, 1879-1889 at Pitts Theology Library, Candler School of Theology
Liddon House papers at Pusey House.

Attribution

1829 births
1890 deaths
People educated at King's College School, London
Alumni of Christ Church, Oxford
People from North Stoneham
19th-century English Anglican priests
English Anglican theologians
English Anglo-Catholics
Chancellors of St Paul's Cathedral
Dean Ireland's Professors of the Exegesis of Holy Scripture
English male non-fiction writers
19th-century English theologians
Anglo-Catholic theologians
Anglo-Catholic clergy
19th-century English male writers
Burials at St Paul's Cathedral